Goniodromites is an extinct genus of crabs. A new species, G. kubai, which existed during the Oxfordian stage of what is now Poland, was described by Natalia Starzyk, Ewa Krzemiska and Wiesław Krzemiski in 2012.

Species
 Goniodromites aliquantulus Schweitzer et al., 2007
 Goniodromites bidentatus Reuss, 1858
 Goniodromites cenomanensis Wright & Collins, 1972
 Goniodromites complanatus Reuss, 1858
 Goniodromites dacica Von Mucke, 1915
 Goniodromites dentatus Lorenthey & Beurlen, 1929
 Goniodromites hirotai Karasawa & Kato, 2007
 Goniodromites laevis Van Straelen, 1940
 Goniodromites narinosus Frantescu, 2010
 Goniodromites polyodon Reuss, 1858
 Goniodromites sakawense Karasawa & Kato, 2007
 Goniodromites serratus Beurlen, 1929
 Goniodromites transsylvanicus Lorenthey, 1929
 Goniodromites kubai Starzyk, Krzemiska & Krzemiski, 2012

References

External links
 Goniodromites at the Paleobiology Database

Prehistoric Malacostraca
Prehistoric crustacean genera
Fossils of Poland